Kentucky Route 187 (KY 187) is a north–south state highway that traverses Edmonson and Grayson counties in west-central Kentucky.

Route description 

The highway begins at an intersection with KY 70 at the unincorporated community of Huff, which is located almost halfway between Roundhill and Brownsville. The first few miles of KY 187 is designated as part of the Duncan Hines Scenic Byway, part of the Kentucky Scenic Byway system. The highway runs concurrently with KY 238 in the community of Sunfish for about a mile (1.6 km). During the concurrency, the highway intersects KY 2330 about  after the first junction with KY 238. The two highways separate about  later.

KY 187 enters Grayson County after an intersection with KY 1075 and passes through Shrewsbury, where it intersects KY 411 and KY 2766. later, KY 187 goes under an overpass that carries the Wendell H. Ford Western Kentucky Parkway and enters the city of Leitchfield before meeting its northern terminus at the intersection with U.S. Route 62 (US 62) on the west side of Leitchfield.

Major intersections

References

0187
0187
0187